Gerald Joseph DeLucca (born July 17, 1936 in Peabody, Massachusetts) is a former American football offensive lineman in the National Football League for the Philadelphia Eagles. He also played in the American Football League for the Boston Patriots and the Buffalo Bills. He played college football at Middle Tennessee State University.

Early years
Delucca attended Peabody Veterans Memorial High School, before moving on to University of Tennessee, where he was named to the second-team sophomore All-SEC team. He later transferred to Middle Tennessee State University.

Professional career

Chicago Bears
DeLucca was selected by the Chicago Bears in the seventh round (84th overall) of the 1957 NFL Draft. He spent from 1957 to 1958 serving his military service. On September 23, 1959, he was traded to the Philadelphia Eagles.

Philadelphia Eagles
In 1959, he was a starter at left tackle for the Philadelphia Eagles.

Dallas Cowboys
DeLucca was selected by the Dallas Cowboys in the 1960 NFL Expansion Draft and was released before the start of the season.

Boston Patriots (first stint)
On September 23, 1960, he was signed as a free agent by the Boston Patriots of the American Football League and became a part of their inaugural season. He was a two-year starter at right tackle, before being traded to the Buffalo Bills in exchange for a draft choice on September 4, 1962.

Buffalo Bills
DeLucca played for Buffalo Bills in all 14 games of the 1962 season. On April 11, 1963, he was traded to the Dallas Texans in exchange for a draft choice.

Boston Patriots (second stint)
On April 23, 1963, he was re-acquired by the Boston Patriots in exchange for a draft choice, to provide depth after tackle Milt Graham was lost to injury. He was released on November 7, to make room for a healthy Graham. DeLucca was cut early on the 1964 season, but was re-signed on November 27, to provide depth because of injuries.

References

1936 births
Living people
Tennessee Volunteers football players
Middle Tennessee Blue Raiders football players
American football offensive tackles
Philadelphia Eagles players
Boston Patriots players
Buffalo Bills players
People from Peabody, Massachusetts
Sportspeople from Essex County, Massachusetts